Rajdevi (Nepali: राजदेवी) is a municipality in Rautahat District, a part of Province No. 2 in Nepal. It was formed in 2016 occupying current 9 sections (wards) from previous 9 former VDCs. It occupies an area of 28.21 km2 with a total population of 31,212.

References

Populated places in Rautahat District
Nepal municipalities established in 2017
Municipalities in Madhesh Province